Carlos Martins  is the name of:
Carlos Wizard Martins (born 1956), head of the Wizard Language Institute
Carlos Martins (footballer) (born 1982), Portuguese football midfielder
Carlos Martins (musician) (born 1961), Portuguese jazz musician